Williamsport Historic District is a national historic district at Williamsport, Washington County, Maryland, United States. The district consists of the historic core of this town. Almost 20 percent of the buildings in the district date from the late 18th and early 19th centuries. They are generally of log or brick construction until the second quarter of the 19th century.  The town grew with the Chesapeake and Ohio Canal and railroads, which resulted in prominent late 19th century Italianate and Queen Anne style buildings for residential and commercial purposes. Slightly less than 60 percent of the buildings date from the late 19th and early 20th centuries.

It was added to the National Register of Historic Places in 2001.

References

External links
, including photo from 2000, at Maryland Historical Trust
Boundary Map of the Williamsport Historic District, Washington County, at Maryland Historical Trust

Historic districts in Washington County, Maryland
Historic districts on the National Register of Historic Places in Maryland
National Register of Historic Places in Washington County, Maryland